Attila Juhász (born July 15, 1967 in Senta, SAP Vojvodina, SR Serbia, SFR Yugoslavia) is an ethnic Hungarian politician in Serbia. He was the president of Senta municipality as a member of Alliance of Vojvodina Hungarians.

He graduated in 1996 from the University of Novi Sad as a teacher of Hungarian language and literature. He worked for the Radio Novi Sad and contributed to the Napló newspaper. Between 1997-2008 he was the mayor of Senta. He is a member of the Vojvodina Parliament.

Personal life
His parents are Ferencz Juhász and Mária Kurin. He is married. His wife is Kornélia Juhász Lassu. They have two daughters, Boglárka and Orsolya.

References

External links
 

1967 births
Living people
People from Senta
University of Novi Sad alumni
Alliance of Vojvodina Hungarians politicians